Innis Brown (March 31, 1884 – January 23, 1961) was a college football player, referee, sportswriter, and civil engineer.  His sports articles were nationally known, writing for the New York Sun and Hearst newspapers.

Early years
Innis Brown was born on March 31, 1884 in Franklin, Tennessee to Enoch Brown, Sr. and Lucinda Allen.  Innis's younger brother Enock "Nuck" Brown was captain of the 1913 Vanderbilt Commodores football team. Both attended Mooney School.

Vanderbilt University
Innis was a prominent guard for Dan McGugin's Vanderbilt Commodores football teams of Vanderbilt University. He was also a Rhodes Scholar.

1905
In 1905 Brown was captain and selected All-Southern of  the 1905 team. One publication claims "The first scouting done in the South was in 1905, when Dan McGugin and Captain Innis Brown, of Vanderbilt went to Atlanta to see Sewanee play Georgia Tech."

Mexico
Upon graduation, he went to Mexico as a civil engineer.

Referee
By 1912 he was a referee throughout the South, chosen by the Atlanta Constitution to pick its All-Southern team that year.

Sportswriter
Having served as editor on Vanderbilt's campus newspaper, the Hustler, Brown began his writing career on the old Nashville American in 1906. He eventually took charge of the sports section of the Atlanta Journal, succeeding his personal friend Grantland Rice.

Golf
Brown was also an avid golfer, being the managing editor of American Golfer in 1919 with Rice.

References

External links
 

1884 births
1961 deaths
American football ends
American football guards
College football officials
Vanderbilt Commodores football players
All-Southern college football players
People from Franklin, Tennessee
Players of American football from Tennessee
People from DeLeon Springs, Florida